Fernando Castro may refer to:

Fernando Castro Pacheco (1918–2013), Mexican painter, engraver and illustrator
Fernando Castro (Colombian footballer) (born 1949), Colombian football manager
Fernando Castro Trenti (born 1955), Mexican politician from Baja California
Fernando Castro (Brazilian footballer) (born 1997), Brazilian footballer

See also
 Fernando Ruiz de Castro (disambiguation)
 Fernando (disambiguation)
 Castro (disambiguation)